Jefferson de Oliveira Galvão, simply known as Jefferson (born 2 January 1983), is a Brazilian former professional footballer who played as a goalkeeper.

Having begun his career at Cruzeiro and spent time on loan at Botafogo, Jefferson then spent four seasons in the Turkish Süper Lig in service of Trabzonspor and Konyaspor before returning to Botafogo. He is one of the eight footballers with the most appearances Botafogo club history, with 459 between the years of 2003 to 2005 and 2009 to 2018.

A former world champion at under-20 level, Jefferson made his senior debut for Brazil in 2011 and was named in their squads for two Copa América tournaments, the 2014 FIFA World Cup and their victory at the 2013 FIFA Confederations Cup.

Club career

Early career/Brazil
Born in São Vicente, São Paulo, Jefferson was an amateur sprinter before joining Ferroviária's youth setup in 1995, aged 12. He was a forward during his starts at the club, but was reconverted to goalkeeper in the process.

In 1997, Jefferson joined Cruzeiro after a successful trial period. He was called up to the first-team three years later by Luiz Felipe Scolari.

In 2003, after committing a number of high-profile mistakes at Cruzeiro, he was loaned to Botafogo in the same division.

Turkey
In the summer of 2005, Jefferson joined Turkish Süper Lig team Trabzonspor in a four-year deal as a replacement for Australian goalkeeper Michael Petkovic. He made his debut abroad on 8 June, starting in a 2–1 home success against Kayserispor.

After three full seasons with Trabzonspor, he moved to Konyaspor, in the same division, but could not prevent their relegation in his only season.

Botafogo
On 25 August 2009, Jefferson returned to Botafogo on a free transfer. He made his second debut for the club on 13 September, keeping a clean sheet in a home draw against city rivals Fluminense.

Jefferson appeared in further 14 matches in the season as Botafogo narrowly avoided relegation. On 18 April 2010, he saved a penalty from Adriano, which granted his side's title of Campeonato Carioca.

On 28 June 2011, Jefferson signed a contract extension through to the end of 2014. He was also elected the best goalkeeper of that year.

International career
Jefferson was a starter for the Brazil under-20 team which became world champions in 2003, in the United Arab Emirates. In July 2011, he was called up to the main squad ahead of 2011 Copa América, acting as a backup to Júlio César, who started in all matches.

On 14 September 2011, he made his first international appearance with the main squad, starting in a 0–0 draw at Argentina, for that year's Superclásico de las Américas. Jefferson also started in the second leg, a 2–0 home success.

Jefferson was named to the 23-man squad ahead of the 2013 FIFA Confederations Cup and the 2014 FIFA World Cup, both on home soil, with Brazil winning the Confederations Cup and reaching the semi-finals in World Cup. Jefferson played in Brazil's 2–0 win over Argentina in the 2014 Superclásico de las Américas in Beijing, saving a penalty from Lionel Messi. He was Brazil's starting goalkeeper at the 2015 Copa América, playing every minute as they reached the quarter-finals, losing in a penalty shoot-out against Paraguay.

Personal life
Jefferson is known for being a devout Christian. On 22 October 2017, he was the victim of a carjacking when he was forced from his vehicle at gun point on his way to training in Rio de Janeiro. He was unharmed during the incident and his vehicle, a black Range Rover, was recovered by police later that day.

Career statistics

Club

International

Honours

Club
Cruzeiro
 Copa Sul-Minas: 2001, 2002
 Supercampeonato Mineiro: 2002

Botafogo
 Rio de Janeiro State League: 2010, 2013, 2018
 Taça Guanabara: 2010, 2013, 2015
 Taça Rio: 2010, 2012, 2013
 Campeonato Brasileiro Série B: 2015

International
Brazil
 FIFA Confederations Cup: 2013
 Superclásico de las Américas: 2011, 2012, 2014

Brazil under-20
 FIFA World Youth Championship: 2003

Individual
 Campeonato Brasileiro Série A Team of the Year: 2011, 2014

References

External links
 CBF profile 
 
 

1983 births
Living people
People from São Vicente, São Paulo
Brazilian Christians
Brazilian footballers
Association football goalkeepers
Cruzeiro Esporte Clube players
Botafogo de Futebol e Regatas players
Trabzonspor footballers
Konyaspor footballers
Campeonato Brasileiro Série A players
Süper Lig players
Brazil under-20 international footballers
Brazil international footballers
Footballers at the 2003 Pan American Games
2011 Copa América players
2013 FIFA Confederations Cup players
2014 FIFA World Cup players
2015 Copa América players
Pan American Games medalists in football
Pan American Games silver medalists for Brazil
FIFA Confederations Cup-winning players
Brazilian expatriate footballers
Brazilian expatriate sportspeople in Turkey
Expatriate footballers in Turkey
Medalists at the 2003 Pan American Games
Footballers from São Paulo (state)